Vetulonia giacobbei is a species of sea snail, a marine gastropod mollusk, unassigned in the superfamily Seguenzioidea.

Distribution
This species occurs in Tyrrhenian Sea.

References

giacobbei